A women's Test match is an international four-innings cricket match held over a maximum of four days between two of the leading cricketing nations. The West Indies women's cricket team first played Test cricket in the 1975–76 against Australia.

Key

Test cricketers
Statistics are correct as of the West Indies women's most recent Test match, against Pakistan on 15 March 2004.

References

Bibliography
 

 
Women
West Indies